Koktuma is a village in Jetisu Region, in south-eastern Kazakhstan.

References

Populated places in Almaty Region